The Grand class is a class of cruise ships. Ships in the class are operated by the cruise lines Princess Cruises or P&O Cruises. The class consists of several series (subclasses) of sister ships, most of which were built by Fincantieri in Monfalcone and Trieste, northern Italy. The first vessel of the original Grand class, entered service in 1998.

Ships of the later subclasses are based on the Grand class, but have modifications such as additional decks and varied placement of facilities such as the nightclub and restaurants. The structure used as a nightclub is a signature element of Princess Cruises' ships in the Grand class and derived classes. The nightclub either overhangs the stern of the ship (Grand and Caribbean classes) or is located just aft of the funnel (Gem and Crown classes).

The Gem class of ships is based primarily on the Grand class, but modifies the placement of the nightclub to be just aft of the funnel and also modifies the number of restaurants. The two Gem-class ships were built by Mitsubishi in Nagasaki, Japan in 2004.

The Caribbean class is the third version of the design and has one additional deck. As in the original Grand-class design, the nightclub is suspended on the stern. Caribbean-class vessels also introduced a poolside theater, which was later added to other Princess ships.

The Crown class is the fourth Princess Cruises version of the Grand class and has two additional decks. Crown-class ships have returned the placement of the nightclub adjacent to the funnel. Crown-class ships also feature a poolside theater like the Caribbean class.

The Ventura class has 19 decks like the Crown class. These ships both owned and operated by P&O Cruises and are marketed as Grand class, although they were given the Ventura class designation because they are not owned by Princess and are totally modified internally and externally. Ventura is also the largest ship in the Grand class. The second Ventura-class ship is MS Azura, launched in March 2010 which has a modified stern. Azura is also the only P&O Cruises ship to feature a poolside theater style outdoor screen.

Ships

References

Ships of Princess Cruises
Cruise ship classes